Cham-e Taq (also Romanized as Cham-e Ţāq) is a village in Cham Kuh Rural District, Bagh-e Bahadoran District, Lenjan County, Isfahan Province, Iran. At the 2006 census, its population was 1,112, in 292 families.

References 

Populated places in Lenjan County